Cretapsyche is an extinct genus of caddisflies in the extinct family Dysoneuridae. It is from the Late Cretaceous (Cenomanian) and specimens are from Burmese amber.

The genus includes the three species C. circula, C. elegans and C. insueta.

See also 
 2018 in arthropod paleontology

References 

†
†
Prehistoric insect genera
Fossil taxa described in 2018
Burmese amber
Cenomanian life
Late Cretaceous insects
Fossils of Myanmar